Jerry Porter may refer to:

Jerry Porter (American football) (born 1978), professional football player
Jerry D. Porter (born 1940s), General Superintendent of the Church of the Nazarene